R. Stanton Avery (January 13, 1907 – December 12, 1997) was an American inventor, most known for creating self-adhesive labels (modern stickers). Using a $100 loan from his then-fiancé Dorothy Durfee, and combining used machine parts with a saber saw, he created and patented the world's first self-adhesive (also called pressure sensitive) die-cut labeling machine. In 1935, he founded what is now the Avery Dennison Corporation.

Avery served as chairman of the board of trustees of California Institute of Technology, and was a member of the board of trustees of the Huntington Library and the board of trustees of the Los Angeles County Museum of Art.

Avery House at Caltech is named after him.

Early life 
Ray Stanton Avery was born on January 13, 1907, in Oklahoma City. Avery lived in a rented chicken coop and worked at the Midnight Mission as a clerk in order to put himself through college.

Education 
After dropping out for a year to live in China, Avery graduated from Pomona College with a humanities degree in 1932.

Stickers 

National Sticker Day is celebrated on January 13, in honor of R. Stanton Avery, who was born on that day.
While gum paste (requiring moistening) had been used on labels since the 1880s,
R. Stanton Avery is credited with creating the first pressure-sensitive sticker (self-adhering without moistening) in 1935.

Philanthropy 
Stan Avery donated generously to educational and arts institutions. He was known for philanthropy in Southern California, having supported the California Institute of Technology, the Los Angeles County Museum of Art and the Huntington Library.

In 1996, Avery created Avery House at Caltech, a residence housing undergraduates, graduate students and faculty.

See also
Dunbeath Castle, purchased by Avery in 1976.

References

1907 births
1997 deaths
20th-century American engineers
20th-century American inventors
Pomona College alumni
Engineers from Oklahoma
People from Oklahoma City